Gorbunov, or Gorbunova (Горбунова; feminine), is a Russian surname. Notable people with the surname include:

Anastasiia Gorbunova (born 1995), Ukrainian alpine skier
Anatolijs Gorbunovs (born 1942), Latvian politician
Andrey Gorbunov (born 1983), Belarusian professional footballer
Boris Gorbunov (1938–2022), Soviet-Russian farmer and politician
Denis Gorbunov (1977–2006), Russian serial killer
Dmitriy Gorbunov (born 1977), Russian professional darts player
Igor Gorbunov (born 1994), Russian professional footballer
Igor Gorbunov (politician) (1941–2022), Russian politician
Ivan Gorbunov (1831–1896), Russian writer and stage actor
Ivan Gorbunov (pilot) (1915–1953), Soviet flying ace
Kirill Gorbunov (1822–1893), Russian portrait painter
Nikolai Gorbunov (1892–1937), Soviet statesman and academician
Oleksiy Gorbunov (born 1961), Ukrainian actor
Pavel Gorbunov (born 1998), Russian football player
Sergei Grigoryevich Gorbunov (born 1987), Russian professional football player
Sergey Gorbunov (1970–2001), Russian volleyball player
Sergiy Gorbunov (born 1994), Ukrainian professional footballer
Tatiana Gorbunova (born 1990), Russian gymnast and Olympic champion
Valeri Gorbunov (1953–1996), retired Soviet footballer
Vladimir Gorbunov (born 1982), Russian professional ice hockey player

See also 
 Gorbunov and Gorchakov, a poem by Joseph Brodsky
 Lavochkin-Gorbunov-Goudkov LaGG-1 a Soviet fighter aircraft of World War II
 Lavochkin-Gorbunov-Goudkov LaGG-3, another one

Russian-language surnames